Gedion is a given name. Notable people with the name include:

Gedion Ngatuny (born 1986), Kenyan long-distance runner
Gedion Nyanhongo (born 1967), Zimbabwean sculptor
Gedion Zelalem (born 1997), German-born American soccer player

See also
Gideon (name)